Stacey Hobgood-Wilkes (born August 9, 1968) is an American politician serving as a member of the Mississippi House of Representatives from the 108th district. Elected in November 2016, she assumed office in January 2017.

Education 
After graduating from Picayune Memorial High School, Hobgood-Wilkes attended Pearl River Community College and earned a Bachelor of Science degree in American studies and business administration from the University of Southern Mississippi.

Career 
Prior to entering politics, Hobgood-Wilkes worked as a public relations consultant and insurance agent. She was elected to the Mississippi House of Representatives in November 2016 and assumed office in January 2017. During the 2019–2020 legislative session, she served as vice chair of the Marine Resources Committee. During the 2020–2021 legislative session, she served as vice chair of the House Constitution Committee.

References 

Living people
Republican Party members of the Mississippi House of Representatives
Women state legislators in Mississippi
1968 births
People from Pearl River County, Mississippi
People from Picayune, Mississippi
University of Southern Mississippi alumni